The following is a list of notable deaths in February 2022.

Entries for each day are listed alphabetically by surname. A typical entry lists information in the following sequence:
 Name, age, country of citizenship at birth, subsequent country of citizenship (if applicable), reason for notability, cause of death (if known), and reference.

February 2022

1
Sergei Anashkin, 60, Kazakh footballer (national team).
Brian Augustyn, 67, American comic book editor and writer (The Flash, Gotham by Gaslight, Justice League), stroke.
Isaac Bardavid, 91, Brazilian actor and voice actor, pulmonary emphysema.
Walter Barylli, 100, Austrian violinist.
Jan Callewaert, 65, Belgian businessman.
Rustica Carpio, 91, Filipino actress (Captive) and playwright.
Heo Cham, 72, South Korean radio and television presenter and singer.
Bud Clark, 90, American politician, mayor of Portland, Oregon (1985–1992), heart failure.
Fred Cook, 74, Australian footballer (Footscray, Yarraville, Port Melbourne).
Paul Danahy, 93, American politician, member of the Florida House of Representatives (1966–1974).
Remi De Roo, 97, Canadian Roman Catholic prelate, bishop of Victoria (1962–1999).
Ramendra Chandra Debnath, 66, Indian politician, renal failure.
James Douglas, 89, Scottish composer and conductor.
Ortega Franco, 80, Mexican Roman Catholic prelate, auxiliary bishop of México (2004–2019).
Lotfollah Safi Golpaygani, 102, Iranian Marja', secretary of the Guardian Council (1980–1985), cardiac arrest.
Paolo Graziosi, 82, Italian actor (China Is Near, Italian Race, Pinocchio), COVID-19.
Robin Herman, 70, American writer and journalist (The New York Times), ovarian cancer.
Juan Iglesias Marcelo, 90, Spanish politician, mayor of Cáceres (1983–1987) and senator (1982–2000), multiple organ failure.
Shintaro Ishihara, 89, Japanese novelist and politician, governor of Tokyo (1999–2012), minister of transport (1987–1988), pancreatic cancer.
Wilfrido Lucero, 86, Ecuadorian politician, prefect of Carchi Province (1970–1974), member (1979–1990, 1998–2007) and two-time president of the National Congress.
Easton McMorris, 86, Jamaican cricketer (West Indies, national team).
Laurie Mithen, 87, Australian footballer (Melbourne).
Stanisław Olejniczak, 83, Polish Olympic basketball player (1964).
Leslie Parnas, 90, American cellist.
Wolfgang Schwanitz, 91, German intelligence official, head of the Stasi (1989–1990).
Harriet S. Shapiro, 93, American lawyer, heart failure.
Tito Stagno, 92, Italian journalist.
Ellen Tiedtke, 91, German actress (Ohne Pass in fremden Betten, The Fiancee), cabaret artist and singer.
Richard L. Tierney, 85, American writer, poet and literary scholar (H. P. Lovecraft).
Larry Warner, 76, American politician, member of the Texas House of Representatives (1987–1991).
Glenn Wheatley, 74, Australian entertainment executive, talent manager (Little River Band, John Farnham) and musician (The Masters Apprentices), complications from COVID-19.
Maurizio Zamparini, 80, Italian football executive, owner of Palermo (2002–2018), complications from peritonitis.
Jon Zazula, 69, American record label executive, founder of Megaforce Records.

2
Djilali Abdi, 78, Algerian footballer (national team).
Hanna Abu-Hanna, 93, Palestinian poet and writer.
Adnan Abu Odeh, 88, Jordanian politician, minister of culture (1970–1972) and senator (1974–1982).
Gajanan Dharmshi Babar, 78, Indian politician, MP (2009–2014), complications from COVID-19.
Alberto Baillères, 90, Mexican businessman, chairman of Grupo BAL (since 1959).
J. Alexander Baumann, 79, Swiss politician, MP (1995–2011), heart attack.
Georges Bertin, 73, French sociologist.
Robert Blalack, 73, Panamanian-born American visual effects artist (Star Wars, RoboCop, The Day After), Oscar winner (1978), cancer.
Frank Bradford, 80, American politician, member of the Georgia House of Representatives (1997–1999).
Ivano Comba, 61, Italian footballer (Sant'Angelo, Piacenza, Rondinella).
Ramesh Deo, 93, Indian actor (Anand, Aap Ki Kasam, Mere Apne), heart attack.
Joe Diorio, 85, American jazz guitarist.
Arthur Feuerstein, 86, American chess player.
Bill Fitch, 89, American Hall of Fame basketball coach (Cleveland Cavaliers, Boston Celtics, Houston Rockets), NBA champion (1981).
Ed Foreman, 88, American politician, member of the United States House of Representatives (1963–1965, 1969–1971).
Ezio Frigerio, 91, Italian costume designer and art director (Cyrano de Bergerac).
Olivier Léonhardt, 58, French politician, senator (since 2017), cancer.
Amir Locke, 22, American musician, shot.
Pablo Manzoni, 82, Italian makeup artist, complications from back surgery.
Paul F. McMillan, 65, British chemist.
Jan Netopilík, 85, Czech Olympic long jumper (1960).
Irén Pavlics, 87, Hungarian-Slovenian writer.
Ralph Presley, 91, American politician, member of the Georgia House of Representatives (1992–1993).
Roy Purdon, 94, New Zealand harness racing trainer (Christopher Vance, Chokin, Petite Evander).
Sophie Rieger, 88, German politician, member of the Landtag of Bavaria (1990–1998).
Gloria Rojas, 82, American television journalist (Eyewitness News, Like It Is).
Tilden Santiago, 81, Brazilian politician, MP (1991–2003), complications from COVID-19.
Bill Short, 84, American baseball player (New York Yankees, Baltimore Orioles, New York Mets).
Wolfgang Stuck, 82, German tennis player.
László Szigeti, 64, Slovak politician, minister of education (2006).
Mosese Taga, 57, Fijian rugby union player (national team).
Noel Treacy, 70, Irish politician, TD (1982–2011), European affairs minister (2004–2007).
Klaas Tuinstra, 76, Dutch politician, MP (1986–1994).
Monica Vitti, 90, Italian actress (L'Avventura, The Girl with the Pistol, The Pizza Triangle), complications from Alzheimer's disease.
Paul Willen, 93, American architect.
Penelope Windust, 76, American actress (You Don't Mess with the Zohan, Murder, She Wrote, V).
Jochen Wolf, 80, German politician, member of the Landtag of Brandenburg (1990–1994).
Hamid Zouba, 86, Algerian football player and manager (national team).

3
Lauro António, 79, Portuguese film director (Morning Undersea), producer and screenwriter.
Georges Athanasiadès, 92, Swiss organist and choirmaster.
Chorobek Baigazakov, 75, Kyrgyz politician, deputy (1990–1995).
Mickey Bass, 78, American bassist, composer and arranger.
Herbert Benson, 86, American medical doctor and cardiologist, kidney failure.
Renée Pietrafesa Bonnet, 83, Uruguayan composer and pianist.
Manuel Bromberg, 104, American artist.
Harry Carmean, 99, American artist.
Lani Forbes, 34, American author, neuroendocrine cancer.
Donny Gerrard, 75, Canadian singer (Skylark), cancer.
Douglas Goldhamer, 76, American rabbi, founder of the Hebrew Seminary.
Joseph Hitti, 96, Lebanese-born Australian Maronite Catholic eparch.
Alex Ingram, 77, Scottish footballer (Queen's Park, Ayr United, Nottingham Forest), complications from dementia.
Tom Kiernan, 83, Irish rugby player (Munster, Lions, national team).
Dieter Mann, 80, German actor (Der letzte Zeuge, Downfall, 13 Semester), complications from Parkinson's disease.
Iwao Matsuda, 84, Japanese politician, member of the House of Councillors (since 1998), hypoglycemia.
Anthony J. Mercorella, 94, American politician, member of the New York State Assembly (1966–1972) and New York City Council (1973–1975).
Madis Milling, 51, Estonian television and radio presenter and politician, MP (since 2015).
Antonio Miró, 74, Spanish fashion designer.
Martin B. Moore, 84, American politician, member of the Alaska House of Representatives (1971–1972), COVID-19.
Mike Moore, 80, American baseball executive, president of the National Association of Professional Baseball Leagues (1991–2007).
Janė Narvilienė, 76, Lithuanian politician, MP (2000–2004).
Erna Paris, 83, Canadian author.
Frank Pietrzok, 57, German politician, member of the Bürgerschaft of Bremen (1999–2005), paragliding accident.
Bob Proctor, 87, Canadian self-help author and lecturer.
Abu Ibrahim al-Hashimi al-Qurashi, 45, Iraqi Islamic militant, leader of the Islamic State (since 2019), suicide by explosion.
Sir Duncan Rice, 79, Scottish academic.
Jarosław Marek Rymkiewicz, 86, Polish writer and literary critic.
John Sanders, 76, American baseball player (Kansas City Athletics) and coach (Nebraska Cornhuskers), cancer.
Christos Sartzetakis, 92, Greek judge and politician, president (1985–1990), acute respiratory failure.
Maggie Tlou, South African politician, MP (since 2019).
Ludmila Vaňková, 94, Czech writer.
Francisco Raúl Villalobos Padilla, 101, Mexican Roman Catholic prelate, bishop of Saltillo (1975–1999), COVID-19.
Felipe Virzi, 79, Panamanian politician and businessman, second vice president (1994–1999).
Evelyn Wawryshyn, 97, Canadian baseball player (Muskegon Lassies, Fort Wayne Daisies).
Dean Zayas, 83, Puerto Rican actor, director, and playwright.

4
FRM Nazmul Ahasan, 66, Bangladeshi lawyer and jurist, judge of the Bangladesh Supreme Court, Appellate Division (since 2022), COVID-19.
Emília Barreto, 87, Brazilian beauty queen, Miss Brazil (1955).
Nancy Berg, 90, American model and actress (Fail Safe).
Tibor Bodnár, 66, Hungarian Olympic sports shooter (1976, 1980).
Sergio Bravo, 72, Chilean screenwriter (Romané, La Doña) and lyricist ("Chile, la alegría ya viene").
Ashley Bryan, 98, American children's author and illustrator (Freedom Over Me).
Davie Cattanach, 75, Scottish footballer (Falkirk, Celtic, Stirling Albion).
Oscar Chaplin III, 41, American Olympic weightlifter (2000, 2004).
Kerry Chater, 76, Canadian musician (Gary Puckett & The Union Gap) and songwriter.
Leland Christensen, 62, American politician, member of the Wyoming Senate (2011–2019), complications from COVID-19.
Avern Cohn, 97, American jurist, judge of the U.S. District Court for Eastern Michigan (since 1979).
Jason Epstein, 93, American editor and publisher.
Neil Faulkner, 64, British archaeologist, historian, and writer, blood cancer.
Steve Finney, 48, English footballer (Swindon Town, Carlisle United, Chester City).
Gianluca Floris, 57, Italian writer and bel canto singer.
Vasyl Folvarochnyi, 81, Ukrainian novelist, poet and journalist.
Rolando Gonçalves, 77, Portuguese footballer (Porto, national team).
Don Johnston, 85, Canadian politician, MP (1978–1988) and secretary-general of the OECD (1996–2006).
Georges Labazée, 78, French politician, senator (2011–2017).
Ana Carmen Macri, 105, Argentine politician, deputy (1952–1955).
Zolani Marali, 44, South African lightweight boxer.
Kyle Mullen, 24, American football player (Yale).
Olcay Neyzi, 94, Turkish pediatrician.
Srboljub Nikolić, 56, Serbian football player (HNK Šibenik, FK Bor) and manager (Jasenica).
Dóra Ólafsdóttir, 109, Icelandic centenarian, oldest living Icelander (since 2019).
Jerzy Osiatyński, 80, Polish politician, deputy (1989–2001) and minister of finance (1992–1993).
Paul Overgaard, 91, American politician, member of the Minnesota House of Representatives (1963–1969) and Senate (1971–1973).
Robert Owens, 75, American politician, member of the Massachusetts House of Representatives (1973–1975).
Pierre Petit, 92, Martinican politician, deputy (1993–2002).
Colin Quinn, 40, Irish Gaelic footballer (Louth).
Peetam Ram, 71, Indian politician, Uttar Pradesh MLA (1996–2007, 2012–2017), complications from COVID-19.
Gene Ransom, 65, American basketball player (Golden State Warriors), shot.
Julie Saul, 67, American art gallerist, leukemia.
Sonia Chalif Simon, 96, American art historian.
Üner Tan, 84, Turkish neuroscientist and evolutionary biologist.

5
Rayan Aourram, 5, Moroccan child. (death announced on this date)
Christel Apostel, 86, German politician, landrat of Wesel (1994–1996).
Mavie Bardanzellu, 83, Italian actress (Beatrice Cenci, The Battle of Sinai, Shadows Unseen).
Martin Barnes, 83, British civil engineer.
Santonio Beard, 41, American football player (Alabama Crimson Tide), shot.
Kenneth H. Brown, 85, American novelist and playwright (The Brig).
John Bryson, 86, Australian author.
Victor Buturlin, 75, Russian film director (Applause, Applause..., The Gardener) and screenwriter.
Chendupatla Janga Reddy, 86, Indian politician, MP (1984–1988).
Cho Soon-seung, 92, South Korean politician, MP (1988–2000).
Geoff Crewdson, 83, English rugby player (Keighley, Hunslet, national team).
Rubén Fuentes, 95, Mexican classical violinist and composer.
David Fuller, 80, American politician, member of the Montana Senate (1983–1987), COVID-19.
Todd Gitlin, 79, American sociologist and author, cardiac arrest complicated by COVID-19.
Angélica Gorodischer, 93, Argentine writer.
Guo Pingtan, 89, Chinese politician, member of the National People's Congress (1983–1988).
Wayne Hankey, 77, Canadian religious philosopher.
Per Christian Hemmer, 88, Norwegian physicist.
John Honderich, 75, Canadian newspaper publisher and editor (Toronto Star), heart attack.
Damodar Hota, 86, Indian classical vocalist, musicologist and composer.
Emanuel Hurwitz, 86, Swiss psychoanalyst and politician, member of the Cantonal Council of Zürich (1979–1984).
Raymond A. Jordan, 78, American politician, member of the Massachusetts House of Representatives (1975–1994).
Ian Kennedy, 89, British comics artist (Dan Dare, Ro-Busters, Judge Dredd).
Anne R. Kenney, 72, American archivist.
Ivan Kučírek, 75, Czech Olympic cyclist (1964, 1968, 1972).
Vijaya Malalasekera, 76, Sri Lankan cricket player (Cambridge University) and administrator.
Fernando Marías, 63, Spanish writer.
Boris Melnikov, 83, Russian fencer, Olympic champion (1964).
Christian Nau, 77, French land sailor.
Bruce William Nickerson, 80, American civil rights and gay rights attorney.
Kenta Nishimura, 54, Japanese novelist.
Abdizhamil Karimuly Nurpeisov, 97, Kazakh writer and translator.
Leili Pärnpuu, 72, Estonian chess player.
Ananda Prasad, 94, Indian-born American biochemist.
Tom Prince, 52, American professional bodybuilder.
Ernst Sabila, 89, Belarusian Protestant religious leader.
Ibrahim Sutar, 81, Indian social worker.
Anani Yavashev, 89, Bulgarian actor (Rio Adio, We Were Young).

6
Angiolo Bandinelli, 94, Italian politician, deputy (1986–1987).
Haven J. Barlow, 100, American politician, member of the Utah House of Representatives (1952–1955) and senate (1955–1994).
Sigal G. Barsade, 56, Israeli-American business theorist and researcher, glioblastoma.
Horst Bertl, 74, German footballer (Hannover 96, Borussia Dortmund, Hamburger SV).
Yahya Butt, 60, Pakistani bodybuilder.
Maria Carrilho, 78, Portuguese politician, MP (1995–1999, 2005–2009) and MEP (1999–2004).
Chang Feng, 98, Chinese actor (If I Were for Real, The Coldest Winter in Peking, Shanghai 13).
Jerome Chazen, 94, American businessman and philanthropist.
Ed Cooke, 86, American football player (New York Titans/Jets, Denver Broncos, Miami Dolphins).
George Crumb, 92, American composer (Ancient Voices of Children, Black Angels, Makrokosmos), Pulitzer Prize (1968) and Grammy winner (2001).
Charles B. Deane Jr., 84, American lawyer and politician, member of the North Carolina Senate (1971–1975).
Gary DeLaune, 88, American sportscaster.
Jean-Pierre Gredy, 101, French playwright.
Ronnie Hellström, 72, Swedish footballer (Hammarby, 1. FC Kaiserslautern, national team), esophageal cancer.
Syl Johnson, 85, American blues and soul singer ("Is It Because I'm Black", "Take Me to the River").
Abram Khasin, 98, Russian chess international master and correspondence grandmaster.
Günther Knauss, 78, German Olympic ice hockey player (1968).
Ryszard Kubiak, 71, Polish rowing coxswain, Olympic bronze medallist (1980).
Lata Mangeshkar, 92, Indian playback singer (Parichay, Kora Kagaz, Lekin...), composer and politician, MP (1999–2005), complications from COVID-19.
Kazuhiko Masumoto, 85, Japanese politician, member of the House of Representatives (1972–1976), bile duct cancer.
Frank McAtamney, 87, New Zealand rugby union player (Otago, national team).
Abdelmalek Ali Messaoud, 66, Algerian footballer (USM Alger, USM Annaba, national team).
Alice Moretti, 100, Swiss politician, member of the Grand Council of Ticino (1971–1987).
Hans Neuenfels, 80, German writer, theatre director, and opera director, COVID-19.
Eleanor Owen, 101, American journalist and mental health professional.
Frank Pesce, 75, American actor (Midnight Run, Beverly Hills Cop II, Maniac Cop), complications from dementia.
Sayyid Al-Qemany, 74, Egyptian writer and philosopher.
Azita Raji, 60, Iranian-born American diplomat, banker, and philanthropist, ambassador to Sweden (2016–2017), metastatic breast cancer.
Zdzisław Jan Ryn, 83, Polish psychiatrist and diplomat, ambassador to Chile (1991–1997) and Argentina (2007–2008).
Raymond C. Smith, 78, American rear admiral.
Wolfgang Stammler, 84, German politician, member of the Landtag of Hesse (1995–1997).
Henry Thillberg, 91, Swedish footballer (Malmö, national team), heart failure.
Ilmārs Verpakovskis, 63, Latvian footballer (FK Liepājas Metalurgs, RAF Jelgava, national team).
John Vinocur, 81, American journalist and editor (The New York Times, International Herald Tribune), sepsis.

7
Abhijatabhivamsa, 54, Burmese Buddhist monk, leukemia.
Noel Allanson, 96, Australian footballer (Essendon) and cricketer (Victoria).
Séamus Barron, 75, Irish hurler (Rathnure, Wexford).
Jerzy Bartmiński, 82, Polish linguist and ethnologist.
Jacques Calonne, 91, Belgian artist.
Chen Shih-yung, 73, Taiwanese politician, county magistrate of Chiayi (1989–1993).
Boris Deich, 83, Ukrainian politician, MP (2002–2014), COVID-19.
William H. Folwell, 97, American Episcopal prelate, bishop of Central Florida (1970–1989).
Jakub Gurecký, 16, Czech motorcycle racer, training collision.
Ivan Hudec, 74, Slovak politician, minister of culture (1994–1998).
Hans-Ulrich Klose, 86, German politician, member of the Landtag of North Rhine-Westphalia (1985–2005).
Dan Lacey, 61, American painter, brain cancer.
Margarita Lozano, 90, Spanish actress (Viridiana, A Fistful of Dollars, Napoleon and Me).
Günter Maschke, 79, German political scientist.
Miodrag Mitić, 62, Serbian Olympic volleyball player (1980).
Jamal Al-Muhaisen, 72, Palestinian politician, governor of Nablus Governorate (2007–2009).
Robert Mulcahy, 89, American college athletics administrator (Rutgers University).
Zbigniew Namysłowski, 82, Polish jazz musician and composer.
Gustav Ortner, 86, Austrian diplomat, ambassador to the Holy See (1997–2001).
Bruce Owen, 90, Canadian lawyer and politician, member of the Legislative Assembly of Ontario (1987–1990), heart attack.
Bushra Rahman, 77, Pakistani writer and politician, MNA (2002–2013) and Punjab MPA (1985–1990).
Andrzej Rapacz, 73, Polish Olympic biathlete (1972, 1976).
Sir Christopher Slade, 94, British judge, Lord Justice of Appeal (1982–1991).
Praveen Kumar Sobti, 74, Indian Olympic hammer and discus thrower (1968, 1972) and actor (Mahabharat), heart attack.
Bruno Trani, 94, Italian Olympic sailor (1960).
Douglas Trumbull, 79, American special effects supervisor (2001: A Space Odyssey, Blade Runner) and film director (Silent Running), complications from mesothelioma.
Fábio Zambiasi, 55, Brazilian footballer.

8
Arnaldo Arocha, 85, Venezuelan politician, deputy (1969–1974, 1984–1989) and twice governor of Miranda.
Mervyn Banting, 84, English Anglican priest, archdeacon of the Isle of Wight (1996–2003).
Sérgio Barcelos, 78, Brazilian politician, deputy (1991–2003).
Javier Berasaluce, 91, Spanish footballer (Deportivo Alavés, Racing de Santander, Real Madrid).
M. E. Chamberlain, 89, British historian.
Mark H. Collier, American religious scholar and academic administrator, president of Baldwin–Wallace College (1999–2006).
George Spiro Dibie, 90, American cinematographer (Night Court, Growing Pains, Sister, Sister), five-time Emmy winner.
Borivoj Dovniković, 91, Croatian film director, animator and caricaturist.
Leonid Filimonov, 86, Russian politician, Soviet minister of oil and gas industry (1989–1991) and Tomsk deputy (1997–2001).
Dottie Frazier, 99, American diver.
Boris Furmanov, 85, Russian politician, minister of architecture, construction and housing (1991–1992).
Bamber Gascoigne, 87, British television presenter (University Challenge) and author (The Great Moghuls).
Igor Gubskiy, 67, Ukrainian artist.
Ricky Hunter, 85, Canadian professional wrestler (NWA, WWF).
Klaus Immer, 97, German politician, MP (1972–1987).
Jean-Henri Jaeger, 78, French surgeon and academic.
Aleksandr Kashtanov, 93, Russian agronomist and politician, member of the Supreme Soviet of the Russian SFSR (1971–1980).
Oshadie Kuruppu, 27, Sri Lankan badminton player, leukemia.
Krzysztof Kuszewski, 81, Polish epidemiologist and state official, under-secretary of state (1994–1997) and acting minister of health (1997).
Bill Lienhard, 92, American basketball player (Kansas Jayhawks), Olympic champion (1952).
Donald Cyril Lubick, 95, American attorney and tax policy expert.
Andrée Michel, 101, French sociologist and activist.
Rosalind Miles, 82, American actress (Shaft's Big Score!, The Black Six, Friday Foster).
Luc Montagnier, 89, French virologist, Nobel Prize laureate (2008).
Mick Newman, 89, Canadian-born English footballer (West Ham United, Dartford, Dagenham).
Valentina Polukhina, 85, Russian-British literary scholar.
Jackie Robinson, 94, American basketball player, Olympic champion (1948).
Hélio Rosas, 92, Brazilian politician, deputy (1987–1999).
Gerhard Roth, 79, Austrian writer.
David Rudman, 78, Russian-American sambo wrestler.
Cliff Sander, 90, Australian Olympic footballer (1956).
Herbert Thalhammer, 66, Austrian politician.
John Q. Trojanowski, 75, American neuroscientist.
Toshiya Ueda, 88, Japanese voice actor (The Adventures of Pepero, Rascal the Raccoon, The Promised Neverland).
Makoto Watanabe, 85, Japanese diplomat, grand chamberlain (1996–2007).
Götz Werner, 78, German businessman, co-founder of dm-drogerie markt.
Gerald Williams, 55, American baseball player (New York Yankees, Atlanta Braves, Tampa Bay Devil Rays), cancer.

9
Rudy Abbott, 81, American baseball coach (Jacksonville State Gamecocks), complications from COVID-19.
Jim Angle, 75, American journalist (Fox News).
Abune Antonios, 94, Eritrean Orthodox prelate, patriarch of the Eritrean Orthodox Tewahedo Church (2004–2006).
Vladimir Belkov, 80, Russian football player (Tekstilshchik Ivanovo) and manager (Avtoagregat Kineshma, Spartak-Telekom Shuya).
David Botwinik, 101, Lithuanian-born Canadian composer.
Valerio Carrara, 70, Italian politician, senator (2001–2013).
William Childress, 89, American author (Out of the Ozarks, An Ozark Odyssey) and poet.
Betty Davis, 77, American funk and soul singer, cancer.
Candi Devine, 64, American professional wrestler (AWA).
Johnny Ellis, 61, American politician, member of the Alaska House of Representatives (1987–1993) and Senate (1993–2017).
Luz Odilia Font, 92, Puerto Rican actress.
Jeremy Giambi, 47, American baseball player (Oakland Athletics, Kansas City Royals, Philadelphia Phillies), suicide by gunshot.
Javier Gonzales, 55, American politician, mayor of Santa Fe (2014–2018), cancer.
Friedbert Grams, 79, German politician, member of the Landtag of Mecklenburg-Vorpommern (1990–2002).
Graham Harle, 90, British-born Canadian politician, Alberta MLA (1972–1986).
George Harris, 81, English footballer (Watford, Reading).
Alicia Hermida, 89, Spanish actress (Maribel and the Strange Family, Black Humor, El bosque animado).
Joseph Horovitz, 95, Austrian-born British composer (Captain Noah and His Floating Zoo) and conductor.
Fabio Duque Jaramillo, 71, Colombian Roman Catholic prelate, bishop of Armenia (2003–2012) and Garzón (since 2012).
Harold R. Johnson, 68, Canadian lawyer and writer.
La Verite, 4, Swedish racehorse.
Ronald Lou-Poy, 87, Canadian lawyer and community leader.
Jan Magiera, 83, Polish Olympic cyclist (1964, 1968).
Ian McDonald, 75, English musician (King Crimson, Foreigner, Steve Hackett).
Juan R. Melecio Machuca, 87, Puerto Rican lawyer, director of the Office of Legislative Services (1981–1988).
Gustavo Mhamed, 45, Argentine footballer (Huracan) and coach (Quilmes AC), colon cancer.
Yahya A. Muhaimin, 78, Indonesian politician, minister of national education (1999–2001).
Peter Neilson, 67, English-born New Zealand politician, minister of works and development (1990) and MP (1981–1990).
Nora Nova, 93, Bulgarian singer.
Snežana Pantić, 43, Serbian karateka, breast cancer.
Johnny Raper, 82, Australian Hall of Fame rugby league player (St. George, New South Wales, national team), complications from dementia.
Kuli Roberts, 49, South African journalist, television presenter and actress (Angeliena).
Ralph W. Sallee, 94, American meteorologist and naval officer.
Reinhard Schwabenitzky, 74, Austrian film director (Parole Chicago, Tour de Ruhr), producer and screenwriter.
Jaime Serra, 101, Portuguese politician, deputy (1976–1985).
Mirian Shvelidze, 75, Georgian stage designer and painter.
Super Muñeco, 59, Mexican professional wrestler.
Kazuyoshi Torii, 75, Japanese manga artist and professor, pancreatic cancer.
Jack Willis, 87, American journalist and filmmaker (The House of Mirth, Paul Jacobs and the Nuclear Gang), assisted suicide.
André Wilms, 74, French actor (Juha, La Vie de bohème, Life Is a Long Quiet River).
Paul A. Yost Jr., 93, American admiral, commandant of the Coast Guard (1986–1990).
Ziad Al-Zaza, 66, Palestinian politician, COVID-19.

10
Peter Awelewa Adebiyi, 78, Nigerian Anglican prelate, bishop of Owo (1993–1999) and Lagos West (1999–2013).
Saleh Ajeery, 101, Kuwaiti astronomer.
Piero Bellotti, 79, Italian Olympic wrestler (1968).
Herb Bergson, 65, American politician, mayor of Duluth (2004–2008), complications from surgery.
Sugnya Bhatt, 80, Indian jurist, judge of the Gujarat High Court (1994–1995), COVID-19.
Evgeniya Brik, 40, Russian actress (Stilyagi, Yolki 1914, Friday), cancer.
Paulo Carotini, 76, Brazilian Olympic water polo player (1964).
Olivia Cajero Bedford, 83, American politician, member of the Arizona House of Representatives (2003–2011) and senate (2011–2019).
Steve Cotter, 81, Canadian football player (BC Lions, Edmonton Eskimos).
Henry Danton, 102, British classical dancer.
Elizabeth Dickson, British lawn bowler. (death announced on this date)
Ken Dixon, 92, British confectioner (Rowntree's).
Dale Doig, 86, American teacher and politician, mayor of Fresno, California (1985–1989).
Bruce Duffy, 70, American author, brain cancer.
Mary Ellen Duncan, 80, American academic administrator, president of the State University of New York at Delhi (1991–1998) and Howard Community College (1998–2008).
Brian Dunning, 70, Irish flautist and composer.
Sir Manuel Esquivel, 81, Belizean politician, prime minister (1984–1989, 1993–1998) and MP (1984–1998).
Olsen Filipaina, 64, New Zealand rugby league player (Balmain, national team), kidney failure.
Philip Fletcher, 75, British public servant.
Duvall Hecht, 91, American rower (Olympic champion, 1956), and publisher, founder of Books on Tape.
Sir Godfrey Kelly, 93, Bahamian Olympic sailor (1960, 1964, 1968, 1972).
Mongush Kenin-Lopsan, 96, Russian writer, poet, and historian.
Jörgen Kolni, 75, Swedish Olympic sailor (1968, 1976).
Roman Kostrzewski, 61, Polish heavy metal musician (Kat).
Eduard Kukan, 82, Slovak politician, member of the National Council (1994–1998, 2006–2009), minister of foreign affairs (1994, 1998–2006) and MEP (2009–2019), heart attack.
Jiří Linha, 91, Czech vocalist and chorus master.
Mwele Ntuli Malecela, 58, Tanzanian civil servant, cancer.
Nikolai Manoshin, 83, Russian football player (Torpedo Moscow, CSKA Moscow, Soviet Union national team) and manager.
Tom McCormick, 96, American politician, member of the New Hampshire House of Representatives (2002–2004).
A. L. Mentxaka, Irish writer and academic.
Mino Milani, 94, Italian journalist, writer, and cartoonist.
Mane Nett, 73, Chilean actress.
Ingvar Oldsberg, 76, Swedish television presenter (På spåret, Bingolotto) and sports journalist, heart attack.
Maria Antònia Oliver Cabrer, 75, Spanish writer.
Aleksander Omelyanchuk, 74, Ukrainian physicist.
Waverly Person, 95, American seismologist.
Donatella Raffai, 78, Italian radio and television writer and presenter.
Francesco Samà, 81, Italian politician, deputy (1983–1992).
R. R. Singh, 86, Indian politician, mayor of Mumbai (1993–1994).
Anthony Stern, 77, British experimental filmmaker and glass maker.
Craig Stowers, 67, American jurist, associate justice (2009–2020) and chief justice (2015–2018) of the Alaska Supreme Court.
Joseph Surasarang, 84, Thai Roman Catholic prelate, bishop of Chiang Mai (1987–2009).
Givi Toidze, 89, Georgian painter and artist.
Erwan Vallerie, 77, French cultural activist, fall.
John Wesley, 93, American painter.
Stefan Żywotko, 102, Polish football manager (Arkonia Szczecin, Warta Poznań, JS Kabylie).

11
Jean Bénabou, 89–90, Moroccan-born French mathematician.
Chen Wen-min, 102, Taiwanese film director, screenwriter, and producer.
Pranab R. Dastidar, 88, Indian nuclear physicist.
Ilia Datunashvili, 84, Georgian footballer (Kolmeurne Lanchkhuti, Lokomotivi Kutaisi, Dinamo Tbilisi).
Lucien Degauchy, 84, French politician, deputy (1993–2017).
Dawn Gibbins, 60–61, British philanthropist and entrepreneur.
Addai II Giwargis, 74, Iraqi Orthodox prelate, catholicos-patriarch of the Ancient Church of the East (since 1972).
Mel Keefer, 95, American cartoonist (Mac Divot), Inkpot Award inductee (2007).
Philippe van Kessel, 76, Belgian actor (Largo Winch II, Eternity, Working Girls) and stage director.
Knightowl, 55, Mexican-born American Chicano rapper, complications from COVID-19. 
Lula, 75, Brazilian football player (Internacional, national team) and manager (Itaperuna).
Ted Mappus, 95, American politician, member of the South Carolina House of Representatives (1987–1991).
Ally Mtoni, 28, Tanzanian footballer (Young Africans, Ruvu Shooting, national team).
Caroline Balderston Parry, 76-77, Canadian writer and musician, pancreatic cancer.
Jean-Marc Piotte, 81, Canadian philosopher and academic, heart attack.
Syed Mohammad Qaisar, 81, Bangladeshi politician and convicted war criminal, minister of agriculture (1988–1991) and MP (1979–1988).
Mike Rabon, 78, American musician (The Five Americans) and songwriter ("Western Union").
Mārtiņš Rītiņš, 72, British-born Latvian chef, businessman, and television presenter, COVID-19.
Dan Robinson, 95, American football coach (Western Carolina Catamounts).
George Rock, 85, Barbadian cricketer (national team).
Ravi Tandon, 86, Indian film director and producer (Anhonee, Apne Rang Hazaar, Ek Main Aur Ek Tu).
Isabel Torres, 52, Spanish actress (Veneno) and television presenter, lung cancer.
Hugo Torres Jiménez, 73, Nicaraguan Sandinista guerrilla and military leader.
Ken Turner, 86, Australian footballer (Collingwood).
Pedro Villagrán, 75, Spanish politician, senator (2004–2008).
Jack C. Watson, 93, American judge, justice of the Louisiana Supreme Court (1979–1996).
Tall Oak Weeden, 85, American indigenous rights activist.

12
Rahul Bajaj, 83, Indian automotive executive and politician, chairman of Bajaj Group (1965–2021) and MP (2006–2010), pneumonia.
William G. Batchelder, 79, American politician, member (1969–1998, 2007–2014) and speaker (2011–2014) of the Ohio House of Representatives.
Frank Beckmann, 72, German-born American broadcaster (WJR), complications from vascular dementia.
Valerie Boyd, 58, American writer and biographer.
Alexander Brody, 89, Hungarian-American businessman, author, and marketing executive.
Zurab Chumburidze, 95, Georgian linguist.
Mireille Delmas-Marty, 80, French jurist.
Bob DeMeo, 66, American jazz drummer.
João Carlos Di Genio, 82, Brazilian businessman.
Javier Gómara, 95, Spanish politician, deputy (1982–1986) and president of the Navarrese parliament (1987–1991).
Tomás Osvaldo González Morales, 86, Chilean Roman Catholic prelate, bishop of Punta Arenas (1974–2006), COVID-19.
Howard Grimes, 80, American drummer (Hi Rhythm Section), kidney failure.
Gladys Guarisma, 83, Venezuelan linguist.
Francis Xavier Sudartanta Hadisumarta, 89, Indonesian Roman Catholic prelate, bishop of Malang (1973–1988) and Manokwari–Sorong (1988–2003).
Makoto Hasebe, 70, Japanese politician, mayor of Yurihonjō (2009–2021).
Robert M. Hayes, 95, American information scientist.
Carmen Herrera, 106, Cuban-born American artist.
Tatsu Ishimoda, 97, Japanese politician, member of the House of Representatives (1972–1976).
Calvin Jones, 58, American baseball player (Seattle Mariners), cancer.
Brian Kan, 84, Hong Kong racehorse trainer and politician.
Zinaida Kiriyenko, 88, Russian actress (And Quiet Flows the Don, Fate of a Man, Chronicle of Flaming Years) and singer.
Moldomusa Kongantiyev, 63, Kyrgyz politician, minister of the interior (2008–2010).
William Kraft, 98, American composer and conductor.
Pete Liske, 79, American football player (Calgary Stampeders, Denver Broncos, Philadelphia Eagles).
Edmur Mesquita, 67, Brazilian politician, São Paulo MLA (1999–2003), COVID-19.
Jit Murad, 62, Malaysian actor (Beyond Rangoon, Waris Jari Hantu, 1957: Hati Malaya) and playwright.
Szabolcs Pásztor, 62, Hungarian Olympic fencer (1988).
Bhanumati Rao, 98, Indian classical dancer and stage actress.
Ivan Reitman, 75, Czechoslovak-born Canadian film director (Ghostbusters, Meatballs, Kindergarten Cop) and producer, founder of The Montecito Picture Company.
Robert Ruwe, 80, American tax judge.
Mark Shulman, 70, Australian rugby league player (St. George).
Stevan Tontić, 75, Bosnian writer and translator.
Antoni Vadell Ferrer, 49, Spanish Roman Catholic prelate, auxiliary bishop of Barcelona (since 2017), pancreatic cancer.
Karl Vaino, 98, Estonian politician, secretary of the Communist Party (1978–1988).
Aurelio de la Vega, 96, Cuban-American composer and educator.
Beryl Vertue, 90, English television producer (Men Behaving Badly, Sherlock, Jekyll), founder of Hartswood Films.
Nolan Williams, 80, American politician, member of the Alabama House of Representatives (1975–1995).
Sharon Wohlmuth, 75, American photographer and author.
Sue Yenger, 83, American politician, member of the Iowa Senate (1979–1983).

13
King Louie Bankston, 49, American rock musician (The Exploding Hearts).
Berit Berthelsen, 77, Norwegian Olympic athlete (1964, 1968).
Shagdaryn Bira, 94, Mongolian historian.
Ann Buchanan, 80, British academic.
Hilda Margery Clarke, 95, English painter.
Dasril Panin Datuk Labuan, 74, Indonesian politician, member of the People's Representative Council (1982–1987, 1993–2003).
Peter Earnest, 88, American intelligence officer and museum director (International Spy Museum), heart failure.
Kajazun Gyurjyan, 99, Armenian stage actor.
Enrique Hernández-Luike, 93, Spanish magazine publisher and poet.
Ferdinand Hueter, 62, Austrian politician.
John Keston, 97, British-born American stage actor and runner, complications from COVID-19.
M. C. Leist, 79, American politician, member of the Oklahoma House of Representatives (1987–2007).
Emanuel Marx, 94, German-born Israeli social anthropologist.
Mikhail Naidov, 89, Russian miner and politician.
Eduardo Pardo, 68, Bolivian economist and diplomat, ambassador to Cuba (since 2021).
Aron Pinczuk, 82, Argentine-American physicist.
Bob Pritikin, 92, American advertising executive, creative director and author.
Fabio Restrepo, 62, Colombian actor (Sumas y restas, Rosario Tijeras), COVID-19.
Aled Roberts, 59, Welsh politician, AM (2011–2016).
Val Robinson, 80, English field hockey player (national team), cancer.
Enzo Robutti, 88, Italian actor (Il Profeta, Tell Me You Do Everything for Me, Dog's Heart).
Eduardo Romero, 67, Argentine golfer (PGA Tour, European Tour) and politician, mayor of Villa Allende (since 2015).
Francisco Sánchez Martínez, 54, Colombian long-distance runner.
Burghart Schmidt, 79, German philosopher.
Halyna Sevruk, 92, Ukrainian artist.
Sandra Worthen, 84, American politician, member of the Delaware House of Representatives (1973–1978).
Thomas Yuen, 70, Chinese-born American technology executive, co-founder of AST Research.
Anatoly Zaytsev, 82, Russian politician, minister of railways (1996–1997).

14
Geoff Barker, 73, English footballer (Darlington, Grimsby Town).
Ralf Bursy, 66, German singer and music producer.
Harold V. Camp, 86, American politician, member of the Connecticut House of Representatives (1969–1975).
Bob Conley, 88, American baseball player (Philadelphia Phillies).
Joan Croll, 93, Australian radiologist.
Kenny Ejim, 27, Canadian basketball player (Zornotza, Saskatchewan Rattlers, Hamilton Honey Badgers).
Tony Fuochi, 66, Italian voice actor, complications from COVID-19.
Francine-Charlotte Gehri, 98, Swiss writer.
Alan J. Greiman, 90, American politician and jurist, member of the Illinois House of Representatives (1972–1987).
Mickie Henson, 59, American professional wrestling referee (WCW, WWE), complications from COVID-19.
Ingeborg Heuser, 94, German dancer, choreographer and teacher.
Graham Houghton, 84, New Zealand historian, co-founder of the South Asia Institute of Advanced Christian Studies.
Borislav Ivkov, 88, Serbian chess grandmaster.
Driss El Khouri, 83, Moroccan writer.
Larisa Kislinskaya, 63, Russian journalist. (death announced on this date)
Elliott Leyton, 82, Canadian social anthropologist, educator and author.
Lin Kun-hai, 68, Taiwanese television producer and entrepreneur, co-founder and chairman of Sanlih E-Television.
Nancy Lord, 70, American politician, medical researcher and attorney, COVID-19.
Željko Mijač, 68, Croatian football player (Hajduk Split, Rijeka) and manager (Standard Liège).
Raees Mohammad, 89, Pakistani cricketer (Karachi, Peshawar).
Jean-Jacques Moine, 67, French Olympic swimmer (1972).
Julio Morales, 76, Uruguayan footballer (Racing Club de Montevideo, Austria Wien, national team).
Richard Mulder, 83, American politician, member of the Minnesota House of Representatives (1995–2002).
Bhargavi Narayan, 84, Indian actress (Eradu Kanasu, Hanthakana Sanchu, Pallavi Anu Pallavi) and writer.
Sandy Nelson, 83, American drummer ("Teen Beat", "Let There Be Drums"), complications from a stroke.
Khayal Zaman Orakzai, Pakistani politician, MNA (since 2013), cancer.
Daniel Passent, 83, Polish journalist (Polityka) and writer, ambassador to Chile (1997–2002).
Hubert de Ravinel, 87, French-born Canadian television producer and writer.
Robert E. Rose, 82, American justice and politician, lieutenant governor of Nevada (1975–1979).
Uli Sckerl, 70, German politician, member of the Landtag of Baden-Württemberg (since 2006).
Alfred Sole, 78, American film director (Alice, Sweet Alice, Pandemonium) and production designer (Veronica Mars), suicide.
Tom Veitch, 80, American comic book writer (The Light and Darkness War, Animal Man, Star Wars) and novelist, COVID-19.
Johnny Whiteley, 91, English rugby league player (Hull F.C., Great Britain) and coach.
Mary Willey, 80, Australian politician and journalist.
Charles Yohane, 48, Zimbabwean footballer (AmaZulu, Bidvest Wits, national team), shot.
Yoo Sang-yeol, 81, South Korean administrator and entrepreneur.

15
Rustam Akramov, 73, Uzbek football manager (national team, India national team).
Artur Albarran, 69, Portuguese journalist, leukaemia.
Lidiya Belozyorova, 76, Ukrainian actress.
Marie Chamming's, 98, French Resistance member and writer.
David Chidgey, Baron Chidgey, 79, British politician, MP (1994–2005) and member of the House of Lords (since 2005).
Mohamed Haddou Chiguer, 90, Moroccan politician.
Bill Dando, 89, American college football player (San Francisco, Detroit) and coach (Buffalo).
Youhanna Golta, 85, Egyptian Coptic Catholic hierarch, auxiliary and curial bishop of Alexandria (1986–2020).
Arnaldo Jabor, 81, Brazilian film director (Pindorama, All Nudity Shall Be Punished, Tudo Bem), screenwriter and producer.
Michael Janus, 55, American politician, member of the Mississippi House of Representatives (1996–2009).
Jeong Changhwa, 81, South Korean politician.
Charles Juravinski, 92, Canadian businessman and philanthropist, founder of Flamboro Downs.
Onur Kumbaracıbaşı, 83, Turkish civil servant, minister of public works (1991–1994), COVID-19.
Bappi Lahiri, 69, Indian singer, composer (Asha O Bhalobasha, Disco Dancer, Namak Halaal) and record producer, complications from obstructive sleep apnea.
Juan Carlos Lallana, 83, Argentine footballer (national team).
Roger Lambrecht, 90, Belgian businessman and footballer, president of K.S.C. Lokeren Oost-Vlaanderen (1994–2019).
Dominique Marcas, 101, French actress (Where Is Madame Catherine?, Liza, Mozart's Sister).
Siegfried Martsch, 68, German politician, member of the Landtag of North Rhine-Westphalia (1990–2000).
Tamaz Mechiauri, 67, Georgian politician, COVID-19.
Peter Merseburger, 93, German journalist and author.
Sandhya Mukherjee, 90, Indian playback singer (Nishi Padma, Jaagte Rahoo, Mamta), cardiac arrest.
P. J. O'Rourke, 74, American humorist (National Lampoon), journalist, and author (Parliament of Whores, Give War a Chance), lung cancer.
Dong Puno, 76, Filipino journalist and television host (Viewpoint, Business Today, Dong Puno Live).
Juan Antonio Quintana, 83, Spanish actor (Amar en tiempos revueltos).
Edgars Račevskis, 85, Latvian conductor.
Bill Robinson, 96, American automobile designer (Chrysler).
Arif Şentürk, 81, Yugoslav-born Turkish folk singer.
Taranath Sharma, 87, Nepalese writer and literary critic.
Deep Sidhu, 37, Indian barrister, actor (Ramta Jogi, Jora 10 Numbaria) and activist, traffic collision.
Woodrow Stanley, 71, American politician, mayor of Flint (1991–2002) and member of the Michigan House of Representatives (2009–2014).
Taina Tudegesheva, 64, Russian poet.
Vivi l'internationale, 75, Beninese singer.
Nachman Wolf, 70, Israeli athlete, Paralympic champion (1984, 1988).
Józef Zapędzki, 92, Polish sport shooter, Olympic champion (1968, 1972).

16
Ba Ge, 67, Taiwanese actor (Orchids and My Love) and television presenter, pancreatic cancer.
Boris Balmont, 94, Russian politician.
R. Wayne Baughman, 81, American Olympic wrestler (1964, 1968, 1972).
Roger Blades, 58, Barbadian cricketer (Bermuda national team) and police officer.
Vasilios Botinos, 77, Greek footballer (Olympiacos Volos, Olympiacos, national team), COVID-19.
John Bowler, 85, English football executive, chairman of Crewe Alexandra (1987–2021).
Erling Brandsnes, 76, Norwegian politician.
Cristina Calderón, 93, Chilean Yaghan singer, ethnographer, and writer, COVID-19.
Lorinda Cherry, 77, American computer scientist and programmer.
Minita Chico-Nazario, 82, Filipino jurist, associate justice of the supreme court (2004–2009).
Michel Deguy, 91, French poet and translator.
Walter Dellinger, 80, American lawyer and academic, acting solicitor general (1996–1997).
Luigi De Magistris, 95, Italian Roman Catholic cardinal, regent (1979–2001) and pro-major penitentiary (2001–2003) of the Apostolic Penitentiary.
Hans-Georg Dulz, 85, German footballer (Borussia Dortmund, SSV Reutlingen 05, Eintracht Braunschweig).
Dorce Gamalama, 58, Indonesian television presenter, COVID-19.
Harry E. Goldsworthy, 107, American Air Force officer.
Dražen Gović, 40, Croatian footballer (Zadar, Šibenik, DPMM), traffic collision.
Gail Halvorsen, 101, American pilot ("Operation Little Vittles"), respiratory failure.
Jeffrey Hyland, 75, American real estate businessman.
Esmaeil Jabbarzadeh, 61–62, Iranian politician, MP (1992–2008) and governor of East Azerbaijan (2013–2017), cardiac arrest.
Stuart Jack, 72, British diplomat, governor of the Cayman Islands (2005–2009).
Chennaveera Kanavi, 93, Indian poet and writer, complications from COVID-19.
Leonard Kessler, 101, American children’s book author.
Andrey Lopatov, 64, Russian basketball player, Olympic bronze medalist (1980).
Didier-Léon Marchand, 96, French Roman Catholic prelate, bishop of Valence (1978–2001).
Saeed Marie, 67, Egyptian judge, president of the Supreme Constitutional Court (since 2019).
Américo Martín, 84, Venezuelan politician, deputy (1979–1984).
Alpheus Muheua, 65, Namibian politician.
Declan O'Brien, 56, American film director and screenwriter (Wrong Turn, The Marine 3: Homefront, Joy Ride 3: Roadkill).
John Aloysius O'Mara, 97, American-born Canadian Roman Catholic prelate, bishop of Thunder Bay (1976–1991) and Saint Catharines (1991–2002).
Pheung Kya-shin, 91, Burmese guerrilla leader and drug smuggler, chairman of Kokang Special Region (1989–1993, 1995–2009).
Jean-Marie Queneau, 87, French artist.
Roger Rager, 73, American Hall of Fame racing driver (USAC, CART).
Marco Salvador, 73, Italian writer and historian.
José Enrique Sarabia, 81, Venezuelan musician and songwriter.
Mona Saudi, 76, Jordanian sculptor and publisher.
Amos Sawyer, 76, Liberian politician, interim president (1990–1994), cardiac arrest.
Jack Smethurst, 89, English actor (Love Thy Neighbour, Man About the House, King Ralph) and comedian.
Ramón Stagnaro, 67, Peruvian guitarist.
Toni Stricker, 91, Austrian composer and violinist.
William Underhill, 88, American sculptor and metalworker.
Valentino Valli, 92, Italian footballer (Milan, Atalanta).
Anthony Wood, 96, British heraldic artist.

17
Romāns Apsītis, 83, Latvian jurist and politician, deputy (1993–1998) and minister of justice (1994–1995).
Bernard Ballet, 81, French actor (Uranus, The Birth of Love).
Jack Bendat, 96, American-born Australian businessman.
Nigel Berlyn, 87, English-born Australian rear admiral.
David Brenner, 59, American film editor (Born on the Fourth of July, Man of Steel, Independence Day), Oscar winner (1990).
Vincent Burke, 70, New Zealand film and television producer.
Steve Burtenshaw, 86, English football player (Brighton & Hove Albion) and manager (Sheffield Wednesday, Queens Park Rangers).
Gary Chaison, 78, American industrial relations scholar and labor historian.
Levon Chaushian, 75, Armenian composer.
Fausto Cigliano, 85, Italian singer, guitarist and actor (Maid, Thief and Guard, Cerasella, Passione).
Pasquale DeBaise, 95, American politician, member of the Connecticut House of Representatives (1967–1973).
Hermann Erlhoff, 77, German football player and manager (Schalke 04, Rot-Weiss Essen).
James Felt, 96, American philosopher.
Máté Fenyvesi, 88, Hungarian footballer (Ferencváros, national team) and politician, MP (1998–2006).
Gerardo Humberto Flores Reyes, 96, Guatemalan Roman Catholic prelate, bishop of Verapaz (1971–2001).
Jim Hagedorn, 59, American politician, member of the U.S. House of Representatives (since 2019), kidney cancer.
Roddie Haley, 57, American sprinter.
Marc Hamilton, 78, Canadian singer ("Comme j'ai toujours envie d'aimer"), COVID-19.
Sudhir Joshi, 81, Indian politician, mayor of Mumbai (1973–1974).
Pradeep Kottayam, 61, Indian actor (Vinnaithaandi Varuvaayaa, Raja Rani, Ithihasa), heart attack.
František Václav Lobkowicz, 74, Czech Roman Catholic prelate, bishop of Ostrava-Opava (since 1996).
Geoff Malone, 79, Australian architect and actor (Homesdale), founder of the Singapore International Film Festival.
Billy McEwan, 70, Scottish football player (Rotherham United, Chesterfield) and manager (Sheffield United).
André Messelis, 91, Belgian road racing cyclist.
Charlie Milstead, 84, American football player (Houston Oilers).
Ahmed Mostafa, 81, Egyptian footballer (1964 Olympic team, Zamalek, national team).
Askia Muhammad, 76, American photojournalist and writer.
Gilbert Postelle, 35, American convicted murderer, execution by lethal injection.
Asavadi Prakasarao, 77, Indian writer and poet, cardiac arrest.
Martín Quirós, 92, Spanish politician, member of the Valencian Courts (1991–2002).
François Ricard, 74, Canadian writer and academic.
Giuseppe Ros, 79, Italian boxer, Olympic bronze medallist (1964), COVID-19.
Sol Sanders, 96, American journalist.
Roger Savory, 97, Canadian Iranologist.
John Scott, 71, Canadian artist.
Surajit Sengupta, 70, Indian footballer (East Bengal, national team), complications from COVID-19.
George Silides, 99, American politician, member of the Alaska Senate (1973–1974).
Martin Tolchin, 93, American journalist (The New York Times) and author, co-founder of The Hill and Politico, cancer.
Henny Trayles, 84, German-born Uruguayan actress (Verano del '98, Floricienta, Graduados).
Clarence "Pooh Bear" Williams, 47, American football player (Florida State Seminoles, Buffalo Bills), traffic collision.
Ahmad Zulkifli Lubis, 50, Indonesian voice actor.

18
Ambalang Ausalin, 78, Filipino weaver.
Gabriel Bach, 94, German-born Israeli jurist, judge of the Supreme Court (1982–1997).
Luigi Di Bartolomeo, 79, Italian politician, president of Molise (1992–1993), mayor of Campobasso (2009–2014) and senator (2006–2008).
John Brewer, 71, American sprinter, paralympic champion (1988).
Leo Fong, 93, Chinese-American actor (Enforcer from Death Row, The Last Reunion), film director (Fight to Win), and martial artist.
Steve Fonyo, 56, Canadian runner, seizure.
Sir Christopher Foster, 91, British economist.
Dorothée Gizenga, 60, Congolese political activist.
François Gros, 96, French biologist.
Haider, 6, Afghan child. (body discovered on this date)
Hans-Olof Johansson, 85, Swedish Olympic sprinter (1960).
Brad Johnson, 62, American actor (Always, Soldier of Fortune, Inc.) and model (Marlboro Man), complications from COVID-19. 
Anish Khan, 28, Indian student activist, fall from building.
Daniel LeMahieu, 75, American politician, member of the Wisconsin State Assembly (2003–2015).
Bardhyl Londo, 74, Albanian writer and poet.
Mauri, 87, Spanish footballer (Athletic Bilbao, national team).
Michele McNally, 66, American photojournalism editor (The New York Times).
Robert George Everitt Murray, 102, English-Canadian bacteriologist.
Boris Nevzorov, 72, Russian actor (Find and Neutralize, Stalingrad, The Fool) and film director, COVID-19.
Hugh Niblock, 72, Irish Gaelic footballer (Magherafelt, St Gall's).
Witold Paszt, 68, Polish singer, complications from COVID-19.
Lindsey Pearlman, 43, American actress (Chicago Justice).
Zdzisław Podkański, 72, Polish politician, minister of culture and art (1996–1997), MP (1993–2004) and MEP (2004–2009).
Héctor Pulido, 79, Mexican football player (1968 Olympic team, Cruz Azul, national team) and manager.
Alexander Savchenko, 70, Kazakh politician, senator (2008–2014).
Chris Scicluna, 62, Maltese singer-songwriter (Chris and Moira).
George Shirkey, 85, American football player (Houston Oilers, Oakland Raiders).
Shamil Sultanov, 69, Russian politician, deputy (2003–2007).
Trevor Swift, 73, English footballer (Rotherham United).
Harold Titter, 91, New Zealand businessman.
Gennadi Yukhtin, 89, Russian actor (The Rumyantsev Case, Spring on Zarechnaya Street, Ballad of a Soldier), COVID-19.

19
Doug Baillie, 85, Scottish footballer (Falkirk, Airdrieonians, Rangers).
Joey Beauchamp, 50, English footballer (Oxford United, Swindon Town, West Ham United), suicide by hanging.
Sergei Beletzkiy, 68, Russian archaeologist and historian, COVID-19.
David Boggs, 71, American electrical and radio engineer, co-inventor of Ethernet, heart failure.
David Bradley, 69, American politician, member of the Arizona Senate (2013–2021) and House of Representatives (2003–2011), cancer.
Gary Brooker, 76, English musician (Procol Harum), cancer.
Jean-Luc Brunel, 75, French model scout, suicide by hanging.
Nigel Butterley, 86, Australian composer.
Bert Coan, 81, American football player (Kansas City Chiefs, San Diego Chargers).
Emile Francis, 95, Canadian Hall of Fame ice hockey player, coach (New York Rangers), and executive (Hartford Whalers, St. Louis Blues).
Marino Golinelli, 101, Italian businessman and art collector.
Roy W. Gould, 94, American electrical engineer and physicist.
Dan Graham, 79, American visual artist.
Franz Grave, 89, German Roman Catholic prelate, auxiliary bishop of Essen (1988–2008).
Peter Grayburn, 96, New Zealand businessman.
Monique Hanotte, 101, Belgian Resistance member.
Adlene Harrison, 98, American politician, mayor of Dallas (1976).
Patrick Hughes, 78, Irish cricketer (national team).
Maggy Hurchalla, 81, American environmental activist, cardiac arrest.
Walid Ikhlasi, 86, Syrian writer.
Franz Krug, 86, German politician, member of the Landtag of Bavaria (1970–1978).
Kyi Hla Han, 61, Burmese golfer, executive chairman of the Asian Tour.
Wilfred Machage, 65, Kenyan politician, deputy (2003–2013) and senator (2013–2017).
Álvaro Manzano, 66, Ecuadorian conductor.
Xavier Marc, 74, Mexican actor (Two Mules for Sister Sara, The Bridge in the Jungle, The Legend of Zorro).
Kakuichi Mimura, 90, Japanese football player (Toho Titanium, national team) and manager.
Nightbirde, 31, American singer-songwriter, cancer.
Jan Pieńkowski, 85, Polish-born British author and illustrator (Meg and Mog), complications of dementia.
Jacques Poos, 86, Luxembourgian politician, minister of finances (1976–1979) and foreign affairs (1984–1999), deputy prime minister (1984–1999).
Rajesh, 89, Indian actor (Boregowda Bangalorige Banda, Devara Duddu, Thavarumane Udugore).
Irma Rosnell, 94, Finnish politician, MP (1954–1987).
Richard Shannon, 90, British historian.
Sir Richard Shepherd, 79, British politician, MP (1979–2015).
Christopher Stalford, 39, Northern Irish politician, MLA (since 2016).
Charley Taylor, 80, American Hall of Fame football player (Washington Redskins) and coach.
Ravish Tiwari, 40, Indian journalist.
Gábor Vida, 92, Hungarian Olympic figure skater (1952).
Gerhard Wächter, 75, German politician, MP (2002–2009).

20
Vasiliy Bebko, 89, Ukrainian-born Russian diplomat.
Bob Beckel, 73, American political commentator (The Five, USA Today), campaign manager, and civil servant.
Abderrahim Berrada, 83–84, Moroccan lawyer and human rights activist.
Leo Bersani, 90, American literary theorist.
Stewart Bevan, 73, British actor (Doctor Who, Emmerdale, The Ghoul).
John Bonney, 75, Australian footballer (St Kilda).
Eduardo Bonomi, 73, Uruguayan guerrilla member and politician, minister of the interior (2010–2020) and labour (2005–2009), senator (since 2020), cardiac arrest.
Fabian Cadiz, 61, Filipino physician and politician.
Shakuntala Choudhary, 101, Indian social worker.
Sami Clark, 73, Lebanese singer.
HO de Villiers, 76, South African rugby union player (national team).
Jamal Edwards, 31, British entrepreneur, author, and DJ, founder of SB.TV, cardiac arrest.
Ken Epp, 82, Canadian politician, MP (1993–2008).
Dawda Fadera, Gambian diplomat, ambassador to the United States (since 2018).
Pierluigi Frosio, 73, Italian football player (Cesena, Perugia) and manager.
Daniel Gómez, 73, Mexican Olympic water polo player (1968, 1972, 1976).
Sam Henry, 65, American drummer (Wipers), complications from stomach cancer.
Christian Herwartz, 78, German Roman Catholic priest.
Joni James, 91, American singer ("Why Don't You Believe Me?").
Merle Kodo Boyd, 77, American Zen master.
Nils Lindberg, 88, Swedish composer and jazz musician.
Fedor Madurov, 79, Russian sculptor and graphic artist.
Ivan Matušík, 91, Slovak architect.
Diane McNaron, 74-75, American singer.
Krystyna Meissner, 88, Polish theatre director.
Réal Ouellet, 86, Canadian writer and academic.
Sadhan Pande, 71, Indian politician, West Bengal MLA (since 1985).
Jack Parker, 94, British Olympic hurdler (1952, 1956).
Margaret Richards, 93, Scottish architect.
Quazi Rosy, 73, Bangladeshi poet and politician, MP (2014–2018), COVID-19.
Teruhiko Saigō, 75, Japanese singer and actor (The Fall of Ako Castle), prostate cancer.
Robert Silverman, 88, Canadian cycling activist.
Felix Strok, 90, Russian diplomat.
Oleksandr Sydorenko, 61, Ukrainian swimmer, Olympic champion (1980), COVID-19.
Francesca Tardioli, 56, Italian diplomat, ambassador to Australia (since 2018), fall.
Henry Tippie, 95, American businessman.
Maurice Tremblay, 77, Canadian politician, MP (1984–1993).
DeWain Valentine, 86, American minimalist sculptor.
Martin Yeritsyan, 90, Armenian violinist.

21
Julio Abreu, 67, Paraguayan Olympic swimmer (1976).
Ernie Andrews, 94, American jazz singer.
Nava Arad, 83, Israeli politician, MK (1981–1992, 1995–1996).
Neil Balnaves, 77, Australian media executive and arts philanthropist, boating accident.
Joaquín Bernadó, 86, Spanish bullfighter.
Roger Carter, 87, British mathematician.
Chor Yuen, 88, Hong Kong film director (Emperor and His Brother, The Duel of the Century, Perils of the Sentimental Swordsman), screenwriter and actor.
John Emery, 90, Canadian bobsledder, Olympic champion (1964), melanoma.
Paul Farmer, 62, American medical anthropologist.
Miguel Gallardo, 66, Spanish comic book author (El Víbora).
Eduardo González Pálmer, 87, Mexican footballer (Club América, national team).
Yevgeny Kozlovsky, 92, Russian geologist and politician, minister of geology (1975–1989).
Nikolai Litus, 97, Ukrainian film director (Queen of the Gas Station, Flying Days).
Mekapati Goutham Reddy, 50, Indian politician, Andhra Pradesh MLA (since 2014), heart attack.
Celeste Sánchez Romero, 32, Mexican politician, deputy (since 2021), suicide by overdose.
Jürgen Schreiber, 75, German journalist and author.
Robert Sward, 88, American-Canadian author and poet.
Anatoliy Turusin, 82, Russian politician, deputy (1990–1993), MP (1994–1999).
Bernardas Vasiliauskas, 83, Lithuanian pianist and organist.
Abdul Waheed, 85, Pakistani field hockey player, Olympic champion (1960).

22
The Amazing Johnathan, 63, American magician and stand-up comedian.
Christos Angourakis, 69, Greek athlete, Paralympic silver medallist (1992).
David Banks, 74, British newspaper editor and broadcaster, editor of the Daily Mirror (1992–1994), pneumonia.
Jesús Tirso Blanco, 64, Argentine Roman Catholic prelate, bishop of Lwena (since 2008).
Louis Bourgeois, 84, French footballer (Lille OSC, Stade de Reims).
Kausar Ahmed Chaudhury, 77, Bangladeshi astrologer and lyricist.
Julio Cruz, 67, American baseball player (Seattle Mariners, Chicago White Sox).
Thomas Demakos, 98, American judge.
Ivan Dziuba, 90, Ukrainian literary critic and activist, minister of culture (1992–1994).
Muvaffak "Maffy" Falay, 91, Turkish trumpeter.
Giancarlo Gallesi, 90, Italian football player (Milan, Genoa) and coach (Vigevano).
Kamil Jalilov, 84, Azerbaijani musician.
Anna Karen, 85, South African-born English actress (EastEnders, On the Buses, Carry On), injuries sustained in a house fire.
Eberhard Kube, 85, German mime artist.
K. P. A. C. Lalitha, 73, Indian actress (Amaram, Shantham, Kadinjool Kalyanam).
Mark Lanegan, 57, American musician (Screaming Trees, The Gutter Twins) and singer-songwriter ("Nearly Lost You").
Alberto Lembo, 77, Italian politician, deputy (1994–2001).
Germain Marc'hadour, 100, French priest and writer, founder of Moreana.
José Martí Gómez, 84, Spanish journalist (Diario de Barcelona, El País, La Vanguardia).
Georges Montillier, 82–83, French actor (CIA contro KGB, My New Partner).
Lasse Näsi, 91, Finnish politician, MP (1991–1995).
Judith Pipher, 81, Canadian-born American astrophysicist, director of the Mees Observatory (1979–1994).
Kumar Rupesinghe, 79, Sri Lankan human rights activist.
Geraldo Sarno, 83, Brazilian film director (Colonel Delmiro Gouveia).
Alex Siebenhaar, 94, Swiss Olympic rower (1952).
Magnus Thue, 42, Norwegian politician.
Josephine Veasey, 91, British mezzo-soprano.
Michael Woodroofe, 81, American mathematician and statistician.

23
Carlos Barbosa-Lima, 77, Brazilian classical and jazz guitarist.
Sheila Benson, 91, American journalist and film critic (Los Angeles Times, Pacific Sun).
Tatiana Birshtein, 93, Russian molecular scientist.
Juan Pablo Colmenarejo, 54, Spanish journalist (Cadena COPE), stroke.
Karl Paul Donfried, 81, American theologian and New Testament scholar.
Margaret Baker Genovesi, 89, Australian opera singer.
Arnoldo Granella, 82, Italian-French footballer (Le Havre AC, OGC Nice).
Don Grist, 83, American politician and jurist, member of the Mississippi House of Representatives (1976–1990).
José Isidro Guerrero Macías, 70, Mexican Roman Catholic prelate, bishop of Mexicali (since 1997), COVID-19.
Mehdi Hasan, 85, Pakistani journalist, media historian, and academic.
Edmund Keeley, 94, Syrian-born American novelist and poet.
George Kinley, 84, American politician, member of the Iowa House of Representatives (1971–1973) and Senate (1973–1992).
Mike Kmech, 87, Canadian football player (Edmonton Eskimos).
Jaakko Kuusisto, 48, Finnish composer, conductor, and violinist, brain cancer.
Jayananda Lama, 65, Nepali folk singer and actor (Chhakka Panja 2, Nai Nabhannu La 5).
Bernard Langer, 89, Canadian surgeon.
Rehman Malik, 70, Pakistani politician, minister of the interior (2008–2013) and senator (2009–2012, 2015–2021), complications from COVID-19.
Yoel Marcus, 90, Israeli journalist and political commentator.
Colin Masica, 90, American linguist.
Rusty Mae Moore, 80, American transgender rights activist.
Kenneth Ozmon, 90, American-born Canadian academic administrator, president of Saint Mary's University (1979–2000).
Riky Rick, 34, South African rapper, suicide.
Britta Schall Holberg, 80, Danish politician, MP (1984–1988, 2005–2011), minister of the interior (1982–1986).
Alberto Sirlin, 91, Argentine theoretical physicist.
Oleksiy Skrypnyk, 57, Ukrainian politician, deputy (2014–2019), blood clot.
Antonietta Stella, 92, Italian operatic soprano.
Andrew Streitwieser, 94, American chemist.
Joeli Vidiri, 48, Fijian rugby union player (Counties Manukau, New Zealand, national team), complications from COVID-19.
Ramón José Viloria Pinzón, 62, Venezuelan Roman Catholic prelate, bishop of Puerto Cabello (2004–2010).
Per Voigt, 91, Norwegian Olympic ice hockey player (1952).
Jorge Zabalza, 78, Uruguayan guerrilla and politician, oesophageal cancer.
Ion Adrian Zare, 62, Romanian football player (Bihor Oradea, Siófok, national team) and manager.

24
Valentin Bakulin, 77, Russian politician, member of the Federation Council (2001–2004).
Ken Burrough, 73, American football player (Houston Oilers, New Orleans Saints).
Roberto Carpio, 91, Guatemalan politician, vice president (1986–1991).
Lillian Chrystall, 95, New Zealand architect.
John Clubbe, 84, American academic.
Viktória Cvengrošová, 80, Slovak architect (NTC Arena).
Dmitry Debelka, 46, Belarusian wrestler, Olympic bronze medalist (2000).
Francisco Dias Alves, 86, Brazilian politician, deputy (1982–1988).
Charles E. Entenmann, 92, American businessman, heart complications.
Lee Everett Alkin, 85, British spiritual healer, psychic and pop singer, cancer.
Jan Gomola, 80, Polish footballer (Górnik Zabrze, national team).
Andriy Ivashko, 41–42, Ukrainian soldier, shot.
Walter Kaegi, 84, American historian.
Sally Kellerman, 84, American actress (M*A*S*H, Back to School, Brewster McCloud), heart failure.
Ivanka Khristova, 80, Bulgarian shot putter, Olympic champion (1976).
Tarik Kopty, 77, Israeli actor (The Syrian Bride, Lemon Tree).
John Landy, 91, Australian middle-distance runner and viceroy, governor of Victoria (2001–2006), Olympic bronze medalist (1956).
Henry Lincoln, 92, British scriptwriter (Doctor Who), author (The Holy Blood and the Holy Grail) and actor (The Avengers).
Johnny McGovern, 89, Irish hurler (Bennettsbridge).
Eduardo Mirás, 92, Argentine Roman Catholic prelate, archbishop of Rosario (1994–2005), complications from COVID-19.
Paddy Murray, 68, Irish journalist (Evening Herald, Sunday World, Sunday Tribune).
Kathleen Nord, 56, German swimmer, Olympic champion (1988).
Gary North, 80, American Christian social theorist and economist.
Bandula Padmakumara, 71, Sri Lankan journalist and television presenter.
Deanie Parrish, 99, American WASP pilot during World War II.
Nida Patcharaveerapong, 37, Thai actress, singer, and racing driver, drowned.
Morley Sewell, 89, British veterinarian.
Vitalii Skakun, 25, Ukrainian soldier, explosion.
Cliff Stanford, 67, British entrepreneur, co-founder of Demon Internet, pancreatic cancer.
Luan Starova, 80, Albanian writer.
Va'aiga Tuigamala, 52, Samoan-born New Zealand rugby league (Wigan Warriors) and rugby union (New Zealand, Samoa) player.
Sir Tony Wrigley, 90, British historian and demographer.
Catherine Wybourne, 67, British Benedictine nun, commentator, and blogger, cancer.

25
Al Autry, 69, American baseball player (Atlanta Braves).
Abdul Hai Baloch, 76, Pakistani politician, MNA (1970–1977), traffic collision.
Hemananda Biswal, 82, Indian politician, MP (2009–2014) and chief minister of Odisha (1989–1990, 1999–2000).
Byun Jang-ho, 81, South Korean film director (The Tragedy of Deaf Sam-yong, The Executioner, Potato).
Paul Cantor, 76, American literary critic.
Estanislao de Grandes, 74, Spanish diplomat, COVID-19.
Gérard-Joseph Deschamps, 92, Canadian Roman Catholic prelate, bishop of Daru (1966–1999) and Bereina (1999–2002).
Lorna Fejo, 91, Australian Warumungu woman, member of the stolen generations.
Farrah Forke, 54, American actress (Wings, Heat, Lois & Clark: The New Adventures of Superman), cancer.
Oliver Frank, 58, German singer.
Laurel Goodwin, 79, American actress (Girls! Girls! Girls!, Papa's Delicate Condition, The Glory Guys).
Robert Hicks, 71, American author.
Shirley Hughes, 94, English writer (Dogger).
Lionel James, 59, American football player (San Diego Chargers).
Klaus Keil, 87, German scientist, cancer.
Alibaba Mammadov, 93, Azerbaijani singer, composer, and teacher.
J. Bradley Morris, 84, American politician, member of the Oregon House of Representatives (1973–1977).
Oleksandr Oksanchenko, 53, Ukrainian fighter pilot, shot down during the Battle of Kyiv.
Michel Le Royer, 89, French actor (La Fayette, Nutty, Naughty Chateau, Her Harem).
Eleonore Schönborn, 101, Austrian politician.
Nancy Achin Sullivan, 63, American politician, member of the Massachusetts Senate (1991–1993).
Irina Tsvila, 52, Ukrainian artist and soldier.
Dimitris Tsovolas, 79, Greek politician, minister of finance (1985–1989), cancer.
Richard S. Varga, 93, American mathematician.
Dick Versace, 81, American basketball coach (Bradley Braves, Indiana Pacers), executive (Vancouver/Memphis Grizzlies), and sportscaster.

26
Ralph Ahn, 95, American actor (Lawnmower Man 2: Beyond Cyberspace, Amityville: A New Generation, New Girl).
Santha Bhaskar, 82, Indian-born Singaporean dancer and choreographer.
Tova Borgnine, 80, Norwegian-born American cosmetics executive.
Jean-Luc Cairon, 60, French Olympic gymnast (1984) and convicted sex offender.
Jānis Cakuls, 95, Latvian Roman Catholic prelate, apostolic administrator (1990–1991), and auxiliary bishop (1991–1993) of Riga.
Moss Cass, 95, Australian politician, MP (1969–1983), minister for the environment (1972–1975) and media (1975).
Barrie R. Cassileth, 83, American cancer researcher, complications of Alzheimer's disease.
Inna Derusova, 51, Ukrainian military medic, shot.
Michail Goleminov, 65, Bulgarian pianist, conductor and composer.
Yūsuke Kawazu, 86, Japanese actor (Cruel Story of Youth, The Human Condition, Godzilla vs. Mechagodzilla II).
Carroll Ketchum, 84, American politician, member of the Vermont House of Representatives (2001–2005).
Carol Lazzaro-Weis, 72, American scholar and translator.
Lee O-young, 88, South Korean critic and novelist, minister of culture (1989–1990), cancer.
Luboš Lom, 57, Czech Olympic cyclist (1988).
Evgeny Maslin, 84, Russian general. 
Gilbert Moevi, 87, French footballer (FC Girondins de Bordeaux).
Kevin Neufeld, 61, Canadian rower, Olympic champion (1984), cancer.
Sunny Obazu-Ojeagbase, 71, Nigerian publisher and author.
Danny Ongais, 79, American Hall of Fame racing driver (NHRA, CART), heart failure.
Duckson Puslas, 31, Sri Lankan footballer (national team).
Andy Remic, 50, British author, cancer.
Ingo Renner, 81, German-born Australian glider pilot.
Paddy Roberts, 82, Irish footballer (Shelbourne).
Antonio Seguí, 88, Argentine cartoonist and painter.
Snootie Wild, 36, American rapper ("Yayo", "Made Me"), shot.
Srihadi Soedarsono, 90, Indonesian painter.
Beth Sulzer-Azaroff, 92, American psychologist.
Nick Tesco, 66, British singer (The Members).
Donald Walter Trautman, 85, American Roman Catholic prelate, auxiliary bishop of Buffalo (1985–1990) and bishop of Erie (1990–2011).

27
Herman Abdullah, 71, Indonesian politician, mayor of Pekanbaru (2001–2011).
Ichiro Abe, 99, Japanese judoka.
Alan Anderson, 82, Scottish footballer (Heart of Midlothian, Millwall, national team).
Yahya Atan, 67, Malaysian Olympic field hockey player (1984), stroke.
Dennis Barton, 82, Canadian politician, Alberta MLA (1971–1975).
Hans-Christian Biallas, 65, German politician and Protestant theologian, president of the Klosterkammer Hannover.
Richard C. Blum, 86, American investor, lung cancer.
Ketil Børde, 87, Norwegian diplomat, ambassador to Switzerland (1985–1989) and Sweden (1994–2000).
Veronica Carlson, 77, British actress (Dracula Has Risen from the Grave, The Horror of Frankenstein, Frankenstein Must Be Destroyed) and model.
José Carlos Castanho de Almeida, 91, Brazilian Roman Catholic prelate, bishop of Itumbiara (1987–1994) and Araçatuba (1994–2003).
Marcel Conche, 99, French philosopher.
Charles Csuri, 99, American artist, pioneer of computer art.
Ned Eisenberg, 65, American actor (Law & Order: Special Victims Unit, Limitless, Flags of Our Fathers), bile duct cancer.
Kenneth B. Ellerbe, 61, American fire chief (DC FEMS).
Leona Farris, 104, American educator.
Brian Fawcett, 77, Canadian writer (Cambodia: A Book for People Who Find Television Too Slow) and cultural analyst.
Marietta Giannakou, 70, Greek politician, minister of health (1990–1991) and education (2004–2007), MEP (2009–2014).
Ken Grandberry, 70, American football player (Chicago Bears).
Dick Guindon, 86, American cartoonist.
Hanna Havrylets, 63, Ukrainian composer.
Teiko Inahata, 91, Japanese poet.
Peter Klæboe, 92, Norwegian chemist.
Fred Lasher, 80, American baseball player (Minnesota Twins, Detroit Tigers, Cleveland Indians).
Gaetano Giani Luporini, 85, Italian composer, complications from COVID-19.
MC Skibadee, 47, British electronic music artist and MC.
Joseph J. Nahra, 94, American judge.
Sonny Ramadhin, 92, Trinidad and Tobago cricketer (West Indies).
Ronald Roskens, 89, American academic, chancellor of University of Nebraska Omaha (1972–1977) and president of the University of Nebraska system (1977–1989).
Robert M. Schaefer, 91, American politician, member (1959–1967) and speaker (1965–1967) of the Washington House of Representatives.
Oleksiy Seniuk, 47, Ukrainian military officer, air raid.
Ramasamy Subramaniam, 82, Malaysian Olympic middle-distance runner (1964, 1968).
Victor Tatarskiy, 82, Russian radio and television presenter.
Mahmood Ashraf Usmani, 70, Pakistani Islamic scholar, jurist, and author.
Manouchehr Vossough, 78, Iranian actor and film producer, cancer.
Kent Waldrep, 67, American college football player (TCU Horned Frogs) and disability rights activist. 
Harald Weinrich, 94, German classical scholar.
Lari Williams, 81, Nigerian actor (The Village Headmaster), poet and playwright.
Nick Zedd, 63, American filmmaker (Geek Maggot Bingo), author and painter, cirrhosis, cancer, and hepatitis C.

28
Jordie Albiston, 60, Australian poet.
Kirk Baily, 59, American actor (Salute Your Shorts, Bumblebee, Trigun), lung cancer.
Abdullatief Barnes, 80, South African cricketer (Transvaal).
Peter Caras, 80, American illustrator, cancer.
Mary Coombs, 93, British computer programmer.
Grenville Davey, 60, English sculptor, winner of the Turner Prize (1992).
Ike Delock, 92, American baseball player (Boston Red Sox, Baltimore Orioles).
Abuzed Omar Dorda, 77, Libyan politician, prime minister (1990–1994).
Mike Fair, 79, American politician, member of the Oklahoma House of Representatives (1967–1969, 1979–1987) and Senate (1989–2005).
Norihiro Inoue, 63, Japanese voice actor (Aoi, Dai-Guard, Negima!?), esophageal cancer.
Merril Jessop, 86, American bishop, de facto head of the Fundamentalist Church of Jesus Christ of Latter Day Saints (2007–2011).
Dan Kearns, 65, Brazilian-born Canadian football player (Edmonton Eskimos, Winnipeg Blue Bombers), pancreatic cancer.
Radhika Khanna, 47, Indian-born American fashion designer, entrepreneur, and author, multiple organ failure.
Kim Jung-ju, 54, South Korean businessman, founder of Nexon.
Leonhard Lapin, 74, Estonian architect, artist, and poet.
Sir William Lithgow, 2nd Baronet, 87, Scottish industrialist.
Roger Lonsdale, 87, British literary scholar and academic.
John H. MacNaughton, 92, American Anglican prelate, bishop of Episcopal Diocese of West Texas (1987–1995), stroke.
Sir Christopher Mallaby, 85, British diplomat, ambassador to Germany (1988–1993) and France (1993–1996).
Mac Martin, 96, American bluegrass musician.
Hans Menasse, 91, Austrian footballer (First Vienna FC, national team).
John A. Murphy, 95, Irish historian and politician, senator (1977–1982, 1987–1993).
Jimmy O'Donnell, 81, Irish Gaelic footballer (Seán McDermotts, Cootehill Celtic).
Dominique Paturel, 90, French actor (The Devil and the Ten Commandments, The Seven Deadly Sins, Good Little Girls).
Bhichai Rattakul, 95, Thai politician, minister of foreign affairs (1975, 1976) and twice deputy prime minister, lung cancer.
Leo Reed, 83, American football player (Houston Oilers, Denver Broncos) and labor leader.
Osbert de Rozario, 97, Singaporean Olympic field hockey player (1956).
Harold Simon, 101, South African pilot.
Andrei Sukhovetsky, 47, Russian general, shot.
Priscilla Reuel Tolkien, 92, British literary preservationist.
Yadlapati Venkata Rao, 102, Indian politician, Andhra Pradesh MLA (1967–1983) and MP (1998–2004).

References

2022-2
2